Eric Arsène Bayemi Maemble (born October 11, 1983) is a Cameroonian professional footballer. He most recently played for Persidafon Dafonsoro.

External links

1983 births
Living people
Cameroonian footballers
Cameroonian expatriate footballers
Expatriate footballers in Malaysia
Expatriate footballers in Indonesia
Expatriate footballers in Belarus
Cameroonian expatriate sportspeople in Malaysia
Liga 1 (Indonesia) players
Fovu Baham players
Felda United F.C. players
FC Dnepr Mogilev players
Persija Jakarta players
Persidafon Dafonsoro players
Association football defenders